The Three Pilgrimage Festivals or Shalosh Regalim, are three major festivals in Judaism—Pesach (Passover), Shavuot (Weeks or Pentecost), and Sukkot (Tabernacles, Tents or Booths)—when all ancient Israelites who were able would make a pilgrimage to the Temple in Jerusalem, as commanded by the Torah. In Jerusalem, they would participate in festivities and ritual worship in conjunction with the services of the kohanim ("priests") at the Temple.

After the destruction of the Second Temple and until the building of the Third Temple, the actual pilgrimages are no longer obligatory upon Jews, and no longer take place on a national scale. During synagogue services the related passages describing the holiday being observed are read aloud from a Torah scroll on the bimah (platform) used at the center of the synagogue services. During the Jewish holidays in modern-day Israel, many observant Jews living in or near Jerusalem make an effort to attend prayer services at the Western Wall emulating the ancient pilgrimages in some small fashion. Samaritans make pilgrimages to Mount Gerizim three times a year to this day.

Sources in the Hebrew Bible

 Book of Exodus: "Offer a sacrifice to Me . Keep the festival of matzos [unleavened bread] ... the reaping festival [i.e., Shavuot] ... the harvest festival [i.e., Sukkot].... , every male among you must appear before God the Lord...." (Exodus 23:14–17)  and "Keep the Festival of Matzahs [i.e., Passover].... Keep the Festival of Shavuot through the first fruits of your wheat harvest. Also keep the harvest festival [i.e., Sukkot] soon after the year changes. , all your males shall thus present themselves before God the Master, Lord of Israel." (Exodus 34:18-23) 
 Book of Deuteronomy: "Safeguard the month of standing grain so that you will be able to keep the Passover to God your Lord, since it was in the month of standing grain that God your Lord brought you out of Egypt at night.... Then count seven weeks for yourself. From the time that you first put the sickle to the standing grain, you must count seven weeks. You shall then celebrate the festival of Shavuot to God your Lord, presenting a hand-delivered offering according to the extent of the blessing that God your Lord has granted you.... When you bring in the products of your threshing floor and wine vat, you shall celebrate the festival of Sukkot for seven days.... , all your males shall thus be seen in the presence of God your Lord in the place that He will choose: on the festival of matzahs, on the festival of Shavuot, and on the festival of Sukkot. You shall not appear before God empty-handed." (Deuteronomy 16:1, 9-10, 13, 16-17)

Other biblical references
In his vision of a restored Jerusalem, the prophet Isaiah refers to Zion as "the city of our appointed feasts,".  Zechariah foretells a messianic era when all nations will come to Jerusalem for the feast of Sukkot. The Song of Ascents or pilgrim psalms (Psalms 120-134) are associated with the pilgrims' journey to Jerusalem.

See also
 Jewish holidays

References

 
Jewish pilgrimages
Nisan observances
Sivan observances
Tishrei observances
Land of Israel laws in Judaism